Vector is a board game published in 1970 by FX Schmid and Plan B.  It is an abstract strategy game consisting of a board and one single movable piece.  Players use cards to send the game piece in different directions to land on squares of different point values, or to go through a goal.  The object of the game is to score the most points by landing on the high point squares, and bluffing one's opponents into landing on less valuable squares.

References

External links
 Vector Game For PC Released

Board games introduced in 1970
Abstract strategy games